The 1961 NCAA Men's Ice Hockey Tournament was the culmination of the 1960–61 NCAA men's ice hockey season, the 14th such tournament in NCAA history. It was held between March 16 and 18, 1961, and concluded with Denver defeating St. Lawrence 12-2. All games were played at the University of Denver Arena in Denver, Colorado.

This was the first time in the history of the tournament that teams from the same conference would play each other in the opening round. The next occurrence would not happen until 2008.

Denver's 10-point margin of victory is the largest ever for a title game and the second most for one team in the championship match, behind only Colorado College in both 1950 and 1957. (as of 2016)

Qualifying teams
Four teams qualified for the tournament, two each from the eastern and western regions. The WCHA tournament co-champions received automatic bids into the tournament. Two at-large bids were offered to eastern teams based upon both their regular season record and strength of competition.

Format
The higher-ranked eastern team was seeded as the top eastern team while the WCHA champion with the better conference record was given the top western seed. Because Minnesota refused to schedule Denver beginning this season as a result of a disagreement over recruiting practices, the two western participants had not yet played each other during the season. As a result the NCAA broke with tradition and pitted the two against one another in the semifinals, leaving the two eastern teams to face one another in the other semifinal game. All games were played at the University of Denver Arena. All matches were Single-game eliminations with the semifinal winners advancing to the national championship game and the losers playing in a consolation game.

Bracket

Note: * denotes overtime period(s)

Semifinals

St. Lawrence vs. Rensselaer

Denver vs. Minnesota

Consolation Game

Rensselaer vs. Minnesota

National Championship

Denver vs. St. Lawrence

All-Tournament team

First Team
G: Mike Larson (Minnesota)
D: Marty Howe (Denver)
D: Grant Munro (Denver)
F: Trent Beatty (Denver)
F: Bill Masterton* (Denver)
F: Jerry Walker (Denver)
* Most Outstanding Player(s)

Second Team
G: George Kirkwood (Denver)
D: George Konik (Denver)
D: Arlie Parker (St. Lawrence)
F: Terry Slater (St. Lawrence)
F: Jim Josephson (Rensselaer)
F: Ron Constantine (Minnesota)

See also
1961 WCHA Men's Ice Hockey Tournament

References

Tournament
NCAA Division I men's ice hockey tournament
NCAA Men's Ice Hockey Tournament
NCAA Men's Ice Hockey Tournament
1960s in Denver
Ice hockey competitions in Denver